Sparebanken Sør is a savings bank based in Kristiansand, Norway. Sparebanken Sør´s main market is located in the counties of Agder, Vestfold and Telemark and Rogaland.

There are 31 branches in this district serving the customers. The internet and mobile banking services are among the most modern in Norway.
Sparebanken Sør is an independent savings bank with total assets of BNOK 90, and 500 man-years as of 1. January 2014.

The bank´s main products are savings, loans and domestic and international payment services. In cooperation with other savings banks, Sparebanken Sør owns companies for insurance, securities and leasing/factoring, and the bank is selling their products.

Sparebanken Sør is regulated by the Financial Supervisory Authority of Norway (Finanstilsynet).

History
Sparebanken Sør’s history goes back to the year 1824, when Christianssands Sparebank was established as one of the first banks in Norway. I

References

Sparebanken Sør's webpage

Banks of Norway
Companies based in Kristiansand
Companies listed on the Oslo Stock Exchange